Drosophila is a genus of flies of the family Drosophilidae. It comprises over 1600 described species, but is estimated to have several thousands. Alfred Sturtevant divided Drosophila into a number of subgenera, including Drosophila, Sophophora, and Dorsilopha.

A

D. abjuncta - Hardy, 1965
D. abregolineata - Duda, 1925
D. abron - Burla, 1954
D. abure - Burla, 1954
D. acanthomera - Tsacas, 2001
D. acanthoptera - Wheeler, 1949
D. acanthos - Kam and Pereira in O'Grady et al., 2003
D. acanthostoma - Hardy and Kaneshiro, 1968
D. acelidota - Tsacas, 2004
D. aceti - Kollar in Heeger, 1851
D. achlya - Hardy, 1966
D. acroria - Wheeler and Takada in Wheeler et al., 1962
D. acrostichalis - Hardy, 1965
D. acrostigma - Tsacas and Chassagnard, 1999
D. acuminanus - Hunter, 1989
D. acutilabella - Stalker, 1953
D. adamisa - Chassagnard and Tsacas in Chassagnard et al., 1997
D. adamsi - Wheeler, 1959
D. addisoni - Pavan, 1950
D. adiastola - Hardy, 1965
D. adunca - Hardy, 1965
D. adventitia - Hardy, 1965
D. aenicta - Hardy, 1966
D. afer - Tan, Hsu and Sheng, 1949
D. affinidisjuncta - Hardy, 1978
D. affinis - Sturtevant, 1916
D. afoliolata - Zhang and Toda in Zhang, Toda and Watabe, 1995
D. agitona - Hardy, 1965
D. aglaia - Hardy, 1965
D. aguape - Val and Marques, 1996
D. agumbensis - Prakash and Reddy, 1978
D. akai - Burla, 1954
D. akoko - Magnacca and O'Grady, 2008
D. alafumosa - Patterson and Mainland in Patterson, 1943
D. alagitans - Patterson and Mainland in Patterson, 1943
D. alani - Pipkin, 1964
D. albescens - Frota-Pessoa, 1954
D. albicans - Frota-Pessoa, 1954
D. albifacies - Hardy, 1965
D. albincisa - de Meijere, 1911
D. albipalpis - Katoh, Toda and Gao, in Katoh et al., 2018
D. albipes - Walker, 1852
D. albirostris - Sturtevant, 1921
D. albomarginata - Duda, 1927
D. albomicans - (Duda, 1923)
D. albonotata - de Meijere, 1911
D. aldrichi - Patterson in Patterson and Crow, 1940
D. alei - Brncic, 1962
D. alexanderae - Pipkin, 1964
D. alexandrei - Cordeiro, 1951
D. alfari - Sturtevant, 1921
D. algonquin - Sturtevant and Dobzhansky, 1936
D. alladian - Burla, 1954
D. allochroa - Tsacas, 2002
D. aloma - Tsacas in Tsacas and Lachaise, 1981
D. alpina - Burla, 1948
D. alsophila - Hardy and Kaneshiro, 1971
D. alternolineata - Duda, 1925
D. altiplanica - Brncic and Koref-Santibanez, 1957
D. altissima - Tsacas, 1980
D. altukhovi - Imasheva, Lazebny, Cariou, David and Tsacas, 1994
D. amaguana - Vela and Rafael, 2004
D. ambigua - Pomini, 1940
D. ambochila - Hardy and Kaneshiro, 1971
D. americana - Spencer, 1938
D. amita - Hardy, 1965
D. amphibolos - Tsacas and Chassagnard, 1990
D. amplipennis - Malloch, 1934
D. amydrospilota - Hardy, 1965
D. analis - Macquart, 1843
D. analspina - Singh and Negi, 1995
D. ananassae - Doleschall, 1858
D. anapuu - Magnacca and O'Grady, 2009
D. anceps - Patterson and Mainland, 1944
D. ancora - Okada, 1968
D. ancyla - Hardy, 1965
D. andamanensis - Gupta and Ray-Chaudhuri, 1970
D. andamanensis - Parshad and Singh, 1971
D. angor - Lin and Ting, 1971
D. angularis - Okada, 1956
D. angustibucca - Duda, 1925
D. anisoctena - Tsacas, 1980
D. annularis - Sturtevant, 1916
D. annulimana - Duda, 1927
D. annulipes - Duda, 1924
D. annulosa - Vilela and Bächli, 1990
D. anomalata - McEvey and Schiffer, 2015
D. anomalipes - Grimshaw, 1901
D. anomelani - Reddy and Krishnamurthy, 1973
D. anoplostoma - Hardy and Kaneshiro, 1968
D. antecedens - Kam and Pereira in O'Grady et al., 2003
D. anthrax - Hardy, 1965
D. anthurium - Llangari & Rafael, 2020
D. antillea - Heed, 1962
D. antioquia - Vilela and Bächli, 2000
D. antonietae - Tidon-Sklorz and Sene, 2001
D. aotsukai - Suwito and Watabe, in Suwito, Watabe and Toda, 2013
D. apag - Vela and Rafael, 2005
D. apectinata - Duda, 1931
D. apicalis - Hardy, 1977
D. apicespinata - Zhang and Gan, 1986
D. apicipuncta - Hardy, 1965
D. apicisetae - Hardy, 1965
D. apiki - Magnacca and O'Grady, 2009
D. aplophallata - Zhang and Toda in Zhang, Toda and Watabe, 1995
D. apodasta - Hardy, 1965
D. apodemata - Okada and Carson, 1983
D. appendiculata - Malloch, 1934
D. aquila - Hardy, 1965
D. aracataca - Vilela and Val, 1983
D. aracea - Heed and Wheeler, 1957
D. aragua - Vilela and Pereira, 1982
D. araicas - Pavan and Nacrur, 1950
D. araiotrichia - Hardy, 1965
D. arane - Hunter, 1992
D. arapuan - da Cunha and Pavan in Pavan and da Cunha, 1947
D. ararama - Pavan and da Cunha, 1947
D. arassari - da Cunha and Frota-Pessoa in Pavan and da Cunha, 1947
D. araucana - Brncic, 1957
D. arauna - Pavan and Nacrur, 1950
D. arawakana - Heed, 1962
D. arboloco - Hunter, 1979
D. arcosae - Vela and Rafael, 2001
D. arcuata - Hardy, 1965
D. argenteifrons - Wheeler, 1954
D. arizonae - Ruiz, Heed and Wasserman, 1990
D. artecarina - Takada and Momma, 1975
D. artigena - Hardy, 1965
D. asahinai - Okada, 1964
D. ashburneri - Tsacas, 1984
D. asiri - Vela and Rafael, 2005
D. asketostoma - Hardy, 1965
D. assita - Hardy and Kaneshiro, 1969
D. asticta - Tsacas, 2004
D. asymmetrica - Vaz, Vilela and Carvalho, 2018
D. atacamensis - Brncic and Wheeler in Brncic, 1987
D. atalaia - Vilela and Sene, 1982
D. athabasca - Sturtevant and Dobzhansky, 1936
D. atra - Walker, 1852
D. atrata - Burla and Pavan, 1953
D. atrifacies - Hardy and Kaneshiro in Hardy et al., 2001
D. atrimentum - Hardy and Kaneshiro, 1971
D. atripex - Bock and Wheeler, 1972
D. atroscutellata - Hardy, 1966
D. attenuata - Hardy, 1965
D. attigua - Hardy and Kaneshiro, 1969
D. audientis - (Lin and Ting, 1971)
D. auraria - Peng, 1937
D. aurea - Patterson and Mainland, 1944
D. aureata - Wheeler, 1957
D. aureopallescens - Pipkin, 1964
D. auriculata - Toda, 1988
D. austroheptica - Tsaur and Lin, 1991
D. austrosaltans - Spassky, 1957
D. avicennai - Maca, 1988
D. ayauma - Penafiel and Rafael, 2019
D. azteca - Sturtevant and Dobzhansky, 1936

B

D. badia - Hardy, 1965
D. bageshwarensis - Singh, Dash and Fartyal, 2004
D. bahunde - Tsacas, 1980
D. bai - Watabe and Liang in Watabe et al., 1990
D. baimaii - Bock and Wheeler, 1972
D. bakondjo - Tsacas, 1980
D. bakoue - Tsacas and Lachaise, 1974
D. balioptera - Hardy, 1965
D. balneorum - Sturtevant, 1927
D. bandeirantorum - Dobzhansky and Pavan, 1943
D. barbarae - Bock and Wheeler, 1972
D. barbata - Magnacca and O'Grady, 2009
D. barutani - Watabe and Liang in Watabe et al., 1990
D. basimacula - Hardy, 1965
D. basisetae - Hardy and Kaneshiro, 1968
D. basisetosa - Hardy, 1965
D. batmani - Vilela and Bächli, 2005
D. baucipyga - Lachaise and Chassagnard, 2001
D. beardsleyi - Hardy, 1965
D. bella - Lin and Ting, 1971
D. belladunni - Heed and Krishnamurthy, 1959
D. beppui - Toda and Peng, 1989
D. berryi - Cockerell, 1923
D. bhagamandalensis - Muniyappa, Reddy, and Krishnamurthy, 1981
D. biarmipes - Malloch, 1924
D. biauraria - Bock and Wheeler, 1972
D. bicondyla - Hardy, 1965
D. bicornuta - Bock and Wheeler, 1972
D. bifasciata - Pomini, 1940
D. bifidiprocera - Zhang and Gan, 1986
D. bifilum - Frota-Pessoa, 1954
D. bifurca - Patterson and Wheeler, 1942
D. bifurcada - Hunter, 1992
D. billheedi - Grimaldi, 2016
D. bimorpha - Singh and Gupta, 1981
D. binocularis - Zhang and Toda in Brake and Bachli, 2008
D. bipectinata - Duda, 1923
D. bipolita - Hardy, 1965
D. bipunctata - Patterson and Mainland in Patterson, 1943
D. birchii - Dobzhansky and Mather, 1961
D. biseriata - Hardy, 1965
D. bisetata - Toda, 1988
D. bishtii - Singh and Negi, 1995
D. bivibrissae - Toda, 1988
D. bizonata - Kikkawa and Peng, 1938
D. blanda - Statz, 1940
D. blumelae - Pipkin and Heed, 1964
D. bocainensis - Pavan and da Cunha, 1947
D. bocainoides - Carson, 1954
D. bocki - Baimai, 1979
D. bocqueti - Tsacas and Lachaise, 1974
D. bodemannae - Pipkin and Heed, 1964
D. boletina - Duda, 1927
D. boliviana - Duda, 1927
D. bomarea - Hunter, 1979
D. bondarenkoi - Sidorenko, 1993
D. boraceia - Vilela and do Val, 2004
D. borborema - Vilela and Sene, 1977
D. borealis - Patterson, 1952
D. bostrycha - Hardy, 1965
D. brachynephros - Okada, 1956
D. brachytarsa - Chassagnard and Tsacas in Chassagnard et al., 1997
D. brahmagiriensis - Muniyappa, Reddy, and Krishnamurthy, 1981
D. breuerae - Rocha, 1971
D. brevicarinata - Patterson and Wheeler, 1942
D. brevicilia - Hardy, 1965
D. brevina - Wheeler, 1981
D. brevipapilla - Zhang, 2000
D. brevis - Walker, 1852
D. brevissima - Hardy, 1965
D. brevitabula - Zhang and Toda, 1992
D. brevitarsus - Hardy, 1965
D. bridwelli - Hardy, 1965
D. briegeri - Pavan and Breuer, 1954
D. brncici - Hunter and Hunter, 1964
D. bromeliae - Sturtevant, 1921
D. bromelioides - Pavan and da Cunha, 1947
D. brunettii - Ray-Chaudhuri and Mukherjee, 1941
D. brunneicrus - Hardy and Kaneshiro in Hardy et al., 2001
D. brunneifrons - Hardy, 1965
D. brunneisetae - Hardy, 1965
D. bunnanda - Schiffer and McEvey, 2006
D. burlai - Tsacas and Lachaise, 1974
D. burmae - Toda, 1986
D. busckii - Coquillett, 1901
D. butantan - Ratcov, Vilela and Goni, 2017
D. buzzatii - Patterson and Wheeler, 1942

C

D. caccabata - Hardy, 1965
D. cajanuma - Penafiel and Rafael, 2019
D. calatheae - Vaz, Vilela, Krsticevic and Carvalho, 2014
D. calceolata - Duda, 1926
D. calidata - Takada, Beppu and Toda, 1979
D. californica - Sturtevant, 1923
D. calloptera - Schiner, 1868
D. camargoi - Dobzhansky and Pavan in Pavan, 1950
D. camaronensis - Brncic, 1957
D. cameroonensis - Grimaldi & Jones, 2020
D. campylophalla - Tsacas, 2006
D. canadiana - Takada and Yoon, 1989
D. canalinea - Patterson and Mainland, 1944
D. canalinioides - Wheeler, 1957
D. canavalia - Magnacca and O'Grady, 2008
D. canescens - Duda, 1927
D. canipolita - Hardy, 1965
D. canuta - Hardy, 1965
D. capitata - Hardy, 1965
D. capnoptera - Patterson and Mainland, 1944
D. caponei - Pavan and da Cunha, 1947
D. capricorni - Dobzhansky and Pavan, 1943
D. carablanca - Hunter, 1979
D. carbonaria - Patterson and Wheeler, 1942
D. carcinophila - Wheeler, 1960
D. cardini - Sturtevant, 1916
D. cardinoides - Dobzhansky and Pavan, 1943
D. caribiana - Heed, 1962
D. carioca - Vilela and Bächli, 2004
D. cariouae - Tsacas in Tsacas et al., 1985
D. caripe - Vilela and Bächli, 2000
D. carlosvilelai - Vela and Rafael, 2001
D. carnosa - Hardy, 1965
D. carolinae - Vilela, 1983
D. carrolli - Gompel and Kopp, 2018
D. carsoni - Wheeler, 1957
D. cartucho - Llangari & Rafael, 2020
D. carvalhoi - Cabezas, Llangari and Rafael, 2015
D. cashapamba - Cespedes and Rafael, 2012
D. cathara - Tsacas, 2004
D. cauverii - Muniyappa, Reddy and Prakash, 1982
D. caxarumi - Penafiel and Rafael, 2018
D. caxiuana - Gottschalk, Martins, Praxedes and Medeiros, 2012
D. cellaris - Oken, 1815
D. ceratostoma - Hardy, 1966
D. cestri - Brncic, 1978
D. chaetocephala - Hardy and Kaneshiro, 1979
D. chaetopeza - Hardy, 1965
D. chamundiensis - Sajjan and Krishnamurthy, 1972
D. chamundiensis - Sajjan and Krishnamurthy, 1975
D. changuinolae - Wheeler and Magalhaes, 1962
D. charmadensis - Gowda and Krishnamurthy, 1972
D. chauvacae - Tsacas, 1984
D. cheda - Tan, Hsu and Sheng, 1949
D. cheongi - Takada and Momma, 1975
D. chicae - Hardy and Kaneshiro in Hardy et al., 2001
D. chichu - Penafiel and Rafael, 2019
D. chimera - Kam and Pereira in O'Grady et al., 2003
D. chisaca - Hunter, 1989
D. choachi - Hunter, 1992
D. chocolata - Yassin & David, in Yassin et al., 2019
D. chorlavi - Cespedes and Rafael, 2012
D. ciliaticrus - Hardy, 1965
D. cilifemorata - Hardy, 1965
D. cilifera - Hardy and Kaneshiro, 1968
D. ciliotarsa - Gupta and Gupta, 1990
D. cilitarsis - Hering, 1940
D. circumdata - Duda, 1926
D. clara - Hardy and Kaneshiro in Hardy et al., 2001
D. clarinervis - Toda, 1986
D. clavata - Hardy, 1965
D. clavisetae - ardy, 1966
D. clavitibia - Hardy, 1965
D. claytonae - Hardy and Kaneshiro, 1969
D. clydonia - Hardy, 1965
D. cnecopleura - Hardy, 1965
D. coffeata - Williston, 1896
D. coffeina - Schiner, 1868
D. cogani - Tsacas and Disney, 1974
D. cognata - Grimshaw, 1901
D. colmenares - Hunter, 1989
D. colobos - Tsacas, 2004
D. colorata - Walker, 1849
D. comatifemora - Hardy, 1965
D. comoe - Burla, 1954
D. comorensis - Tsacas in Lemeunier et al., 1997
D. comosa - Wheeler, 1968
D. condormachay - Vela and Rafael, 2005
D. confertidentata - Zhang, Li and Feng, 2006
D. conformis - Hardy, 1965
D. confutata - Hardy, 1965
D. conjectura - Hardy, 1965
D. conspicua - Grimshaw, 1901
D. constricta - Okada and Carson, 1983
D. contorta - Hardy, 1965
D. converga - Heed and Wheeler, 1957
D. cordata - Sturtevant, 1942
D. cordeiroi - Brncic, 1978
D. cornixa - Takada, Momma and Shima, 1973
D. cornutitarsus - Hardy and Kaneshiro, 1979
D. coroica - Wasserman, 1962
D. cosanga - Guillin and Rafael, 2017
D. couturieri - Tsacas, 2006
D. cracens - Hardy, 1965
D. craddockae - Kaneshiro and Kambysellis, 1999
D. crassa - Patterson and Mainland, 1944
D. crispipennis - Okada and Carson, 1983
D. crossoptera - Wheeler and Takada in Wheeler et al., 1962
D. crucigera - Grimshaw, 1902
D. cryptica - De and Gupta, 1996
D. cryptica - Hardy and Kaneshiro in Hardy et al., 2001
D. cuaso - Bächli, Vilela and Ratcov, 2000
D. cuauhtemoci - Felix and Dobzhansky in Felix et al., 1976
D. cubicivittata - Okada, 1966
D. cundinamarca - Vilela and Bächli, 2000
D. curiosa - Hardy and Kaneshiro in O'Grady et al., 2001
D. curta - Chassagnard and Tsacas in Chassagnard et al., 1997
D. curticilia - Hardy, 1965
D. curtitarsis - Hardy and Kaneshiro in Hardy et al., 2001
D. curvapex - Frota-Pessoa, 1954
D. curvata - Hardy, 1977
D. curvicapillata - Duda, 1923
D. curviceps - Okada and Kurokawa, 1957
D. curvispina - Watabe and Toda, 1984
D. curvitibia - Hardy, 1965
D. cuscungu - Vela and Rafael, 2005
D. cuyuja - Guillin and Rafael, 2015
D. cuzcoica - Duda, 1927
D. cyrtoloma - Hardy, 1969

D

D. dacunhai - Mourao and Bicudo, 1967
D. daruma - Okada, 1956
D. dasycnemia - Hardy, 1965
D. davidgrimaldii - Vilela and Bächli, 1990
D. davidi - Tsacas, 1975
D. debilis - Walker, 1849
D. decemseriata - Hendel, 1936
D. decolor - Tsacas and Chassagnard, 1994
D. deflecta - Malloch in Malloch and McAtee, 1924
D. deloscolorados - Llangari & Rafael, 2020
D. deltaneuron - Bryan, 1938
D. demipolita - Hardy, 1965
D. denieri - Blanchard, 1938
D. denotata - Hardy, 1965
D. denruoi - Suwito and Watabe, 2014
D. denticulata - Bock and Wheeler, 1972
D. dentilabia - Magnacca and O'Grady, 2009
D. dentissima - Bock and Wheeler, 1972
D. desallei - Magnacca and O'Grady, 2009
D. desavrilia - Tsacas, 1985
D. desbaratabaile - Hunter, 1979
D. desertorum - Wasserman, 1962
D. diama - Burla, 1954
D. diamphidia - Hardy, 1965
D. diamphidiopoda - Hardy, 1965
D. dianensis - Gao, Watabe, Toda, Zhang and Aotsuka, 2003
D. dicropeza - Hardy and Kaneshiro, 1979
D. dictena - Tsacas and Chassagnard, 1992
D. differens - Hardy and Kaneshiro, 1975
D. diffusa - Hardy, 1965
D. digressa - Hardy and Kaneshiro, 1968
D. dilacerata - Becker, 1919
D. diminuens - Hardy, 1965
D. dimitra - Tsacas in Tsacas and Lachaise, 1981
D. dimitroides - Chassagnard and Tsacas in Chassagnard et al., 1997
D. diplacantha - Tsacas and David, 1977
D. diplochaeta - Tsacas, 2003
D. discreta - Hardy and Kaneshiro, 1968
D. disjuncta - Hardy, 1965
D. dispar - Mather, 1955
D. dissimilis - Katoh and Gao, in Katoh et al., 2018
D. dissita - Hardy, 1965
D. distinguenda - Hardy, 1965
D. divaricata - Hardy and Kaneshiro, 1971
D. dives - Hardy and Kaneshiro in Hardy et al., 2001
D. divisa - Duda, 1927
D. dobzhanskii - Patterson, 1943
D. dolichotarsis - Hardy, 1966
D. dolomata - Hardy, 1965
D. dominicana - Ayala, 1965
D. dominici - Dwivedi, 1982
D. dorsalis - Walker, 1865
D. dorsigera - Hardy, 1965
D. dorsivitta - Walker, 1861
D. dorsociliata - Hardy, 1965
D. dossoui - Chassagnard, 1991
D. dracaenae - Hardy, 1965
D. dreyfusi - Dobzhansky and Pavan, 1943
D. dumalis - Hardy, 1965
D. dumuya - Burla, 1954
D. dunni - Townsend and Wheeler, 1955
D. dyaramankana - Burla, 1954
D. dyula - Burla, 1954

E

D. echinostoma - Kam and Pereira in O'Grady et al., 2003
D. ecuatoriana - Vela and Rafael, 2004
D. editinares - Okada, 1966
D. elegans - Bock and Wheeler, 1972
D. eleonorae - Tosi et al., 1990
D. elliptica - Sturtevant, 1942
D. ellisoni - Vilela, 1983
D. elongata - Sturtevant, 1927
D. emarginata - Sturtevant, 1942
D. eminentiula - Zhang and Shi in Zhang, Toda and Watabe, 1995
D. enderbyi - Hutton, 1902
D. endobranchia - Carson and Wheeler, 1968
D. engyochracea - Hardy, 1965
D. enhydrobia - Bächli and Tsacas, 2005
D. eniwae - Takada, Beppu and Toda, 1979
D. enoplotarsus - Hardy, 1965
D. entrichocnema - Hardy, 1965
D. eohydei - Wasserman, 1962
D. epiobscura - Parshad and Duggal, 1966
D. eprocessata - Zhang and Toda in Zhang, Toda and Watabe, 1995
D. equinoxialis - Dobzhansky, 1946
D. ercepeae - Tsacas and David, 1975
D. erebopis - Tsacas, 2004
D. erecta - Tsacas and Lachaise, 1974
D. eremophila - Wasserman, 1962
D. eskoi - Lakovaara and Lankinen, 1974
D. eugracilis - Bock and Wheeler, 1972
D. eumecothrix - Hardy, 1965
D. eupyga - Tsacas, 1981
D. euronotus - Patterson and Ward, 1952
D. eurypeza - Hardy, 1965
D. exiguitata - Takada, Momma and Shima, 1973
D. eximia - Hardy, 1965
D. expansa - Hardy, 1965
D. ezoana - Takada and Okada, 1958

F

D. facialba - Heed and Wheeler, 1957
D. facialis - Adams, 1905
D. fairchildi - Pipkin and Heed, 1964
D. falleni - Wheeler, 1960
D. fasciculisetae - Hardy, 1965
D. fascigera - Hardy and Kaneshiro in Hardy et al., 2001
D. fasciola - Williston, 1896
D. fascioloides - Dobzhansky and Pavan, 1943
D. fastigata - Hardy, 1965
D. fengkainensis - Chen in Brake and Bachli, 2008
D. ferruginea - Becker, 1919
D. ficusphila - Kikkawa and Peng, 1938
D. fima - Burla, 1954
D. flavibasis - Hardy, 1965
D. flavicauda - Toda, 1991
D. flaviceps - Grimshaw, 1901
D. flavimedifemur - Zhang and Toda, 1988
D. flavisternum - Hardy, 1965
D. flavitibiae - Toda, 1986
D. flavohirta - Malloch, 1924
D. flavomontana - Patterson, 1952
D. flavopilosa - Frey, 1919
D. flavopinicola - Wheeler, 1954
D. flavopleuralis - Takada, Momma and Shima, 1973
D. flexa - Loew, 1866
D. flexipes - Hardy and Kaneshiro, 1968
D. florae - Sturtevant, 1916
D. flumenicola - Watabe and Peng, 1991
D. fluminensis - Vilela and Bächli, 2004
D. fluvialis - Toda and Peng, 1989
D. fontdevilai - Vela and Rafael, 2001
D. forficata - Hardy and Kaneshiro, 1979
D. formella - Hardy and Kaneshiro, 1972
D. formosana - Duda, 1926
D. formosana - Sturtevant, 1927
D. fraburu - Burla, 1954
D. fragilis - Wheeler, 1949
D. franii - Hunter, 1989
D. freidbergi - Grimaldi & Jones, 2020
D. freilejoni - Hunter, 1979
D. freiremaiai - Vilela and Bächli, 2000
D. freycinetiae - Hardy, 1965
D. frolovae - Wheeler, 1949
D. fronto - Walker, 1852
D. frotapessoai - Vilela and Bächli, 1990
D. fruhstorferi - Duda, 1924
D. fulgida - Hardy and Kaneshiro in Hardy et al., 2001
D. fulva - Watabe and Li in Watabe et al., 1993
D. fulvalineata - Patterson and Wheeler, 1942
D. fulvimacula - Patterson and Mainland, 1944
D. fulvimaculoides - Wasserman and Wilson, 1957
D. fumifera - Wheeler and Takada, 1964
D. fumipennis - Duda, 1925
D. fundita - Hardy, 1965
D. fundomaculata - Duda, 1925
D. funebris - (Fabricius, 1787)
D. fungiperda - Hardy, 1966
D. furcatarsus - Hardy and Kaneshiro, 1979
D. furva - Hardy, 1965
D. furvifacies - Hardy, 1965
D. fusca - Coquillett, 1900
D. fuscicostata - Okada, 1966
D. fuscifrons - Hardy, 1965
D. fuscipennis - Duda, 1927
D. fuscoamoeba - Bryan, 1934
D. fuscoapex - Hardy, 1965
D. fuscolineata - Duda, 1925
D. fusticula - Hardy, 1965
D. fustiformis - Zhang and Liang, 1993
D. fusus - Okada, 1988
D. fuyamai - Toda, 1991

G

D. gagne - Kam and Pereira in O'Grady et al., 2003
D. gangotrii - Muniyappa and Reddy, 1981
D. gani - Liang and Zhang in Watabe et al., 1990
D. gapudi - Ruiz-Fiegalan, 2003
D. gasici - Brncic, 1957
D. gata - Lachaise and Chassagnard, 2001
D. gaucha - Jaeger and Salzano, 1953
D. gemmula - Hardy, 1965
D. gentica - Wheeler and Takada in Wheeler et al., 1962
D. gibberosa - Patterson and Mainland in Patterson, 1943
D. gibbinsi - Aubertin, 1937
D. gigas - Duda, 1925
D. gilvilateralis - Hardy, 1965
D. giriensis - Prakash and Reddy, 1977
D. glabra - Chen & Gao, 2015
D. glabriapex - Hardy and Kaneshiro, 1968
D. gladius - Magnacca and O'Grady, 2009
D. gorokaensis - Okada and Carson, 1982
D. goureaui - Hardy in Hardy and Kaneshiro, 1972
D. gouveai - Tidon-Sklorz and Sene, 2001
D. gracilipalpis - Katoh and Gao, in Katoh et al., 2018
D. gradata - Hardy and Kaneshiro, 1968
D. greeni - Bock and Wheeler, 1972
D. greerae - Pipkin and Heed, 1964
D. grimshawi - Oldenberg, 1914
D. griseicollis - Becker, 1919
D. griseolineata - Duda, 1927
D. guacamaya - Bächli and Vilela, 2002
D. guacamayos - Guillin and Rafael, 2017
D. guajalito - Llangari & Rafael, 2020
D. guanche - Monclus, 1976
D. guangdongensis - Toda and Peng, 1989
D. guaraja - King, 1947
D. guaru - Dobzhansky and Pavan, 1943
D. guayllabambae - Rafael and Arcos, 1988
D. gubleri - Hardy, 1966
D. gundensis - Prakash and Reddy, 1977
D. gunungcola - Sultana, Kimura, and Toda, 1999
D. guptai - Dwivedi, 1979
D. guttifera - Walker, 1849
D. gymnobasis - Hardy and Kaneshiro, 1971
D. gymnophallus - Hardy and Kaneshiro, 1975

H

D. halapepe - Magnacca and O'Grady, 2008
D. haleakalae - Grimshaw, 1901
D. hamatofila - Patterson and Wheeler, 1942
D. hamifera - Hardy and Kaneshiro, 1968
D. hanaulae - Hardy, 1969
D. hansoni - Pipkin, 1964
D. hansonioides - Pipkin, 1966
D. hawaiiensis - Grimshaw, 1901
D. heedi - Hardy and Kaneshiro, 1971
D. hegdii - Achumi, Lal and Yenisetti, 2011
D. hei - Watabe and Peng, 1991
D. helvetica - Burla, 1948
D. hemianthrax - Hardy and Kaneshiro in Hardy et al., 2001
D. hemipeza - Hardy, 1965
D. hendeli - Vilela and Bächli, 1990
D. hermioneae - Vilela, 1983
D. heterobristalis - Tan, Hsu and Sheng, 1949
D. heteroneura - erkins, 1910
D. hexachaetae - Hardy, 1965
D. hexaspina - Singh, Dash and Fartyal, 2004
D. hexastigma - Patterson and Mainland, 1944
D. hexastriata - Tan, Hsu and Sheng, 1949
D. hideakii - Gao & Toda, in Gao, Tanabe & Toda, 2009
D. hirticoxa - Hardy, 1965
D. hirtipalpus - Hardy and Kaneshiro, 1968
D. hirtipes - Lamb, 1914
D. hirtitarsus - Hardy, 1965
D. hirtitibia - Hardy, 1965
D. histrio - Meigen, 1830
D. hollisae - Vilela and Pereira, 1992
D. hoozani - Duda, 1923
D. huancavilcae - Rafael and Arcos, 1989
D. huangshanensis - Watabe in Brake and Bachli, 2008
D. huayla - Suyo, Pilares and Vasquez, 1988
D. huaylasi - Pla and Fontdevila in Fontdevila et al., 1990
D. hubeiensis - Sperlich and Watabe in Watabe and Sperlich, 1997
D. huckinsi - Etges and Heed in Etges et al., 2001
D. huichole - Etges and Heed in Etges at al., 2001
D. huilliche - Brncic, 1957
D. humeralis - Grimshaw, 1901
D. hyalipennis - Duda, 1927
D. hydei - Sturtevant, 1921
D. hydroessa - Bächli and Tsacas, 2005
D. hypandrilata - Grimaldi & Jones, 2020
D. hypercephala - Gao & Toda, in Gao, Tanabe & Toda, 2009
D. hyperpolychaeta - Okada, 1988
D. hypocausta - Osten Sacken, 1882
D. hypomelana - Okada and Carson, 1983
D. hystricosa - Hardy and Kaneshiro, 1969

I

D. ichinosei - Zhang and Toda in Zhang, Toda and Watabe, 1995
D. ichubamba - Vela and Rafael, 2005
D. icteroscuta - Wheeler, 1949
D. ifestia - Tsacas, 1984
D. iki - Bryan, 1934
D. illata - Walker, 1860
D. illota - Williston, 1896
D. illusiopolita - Hardy, 1965
D. imaii - Moriwaki and Okada in Moriwaki et al., 1967
D. imitator - Hardy, 1965
D. immacularis - Okada, 1966
D. immigrans - Sturtevant, 1921
D. imparisetae - Hardy, 1965
D. improcera - Hardy, 1965
D. impudica - Duda, 1927
D. inca - Dobzhansky and Pavan, 1943
D. inciliata - Hardy and Kaneshiro, 1968
D. incognita - Hardy, 1965
D. incompleta - Hardy, 1965
D. incompta - Wheeler and Takada in Wheeler et al., 1962
D. incongruens - Magnacca and O'Grady, 2009
D. inebria - Kam and Pereira in O'Grady et al., 2003
D. inedita - Hardy, 1965
D. inexspectata - Tsacas, 1988
D. infuscata - Grimshaw, 1901
D. ingens - Hardy and Kaneshiro, 1971
D. ingrata - Haliday, 1833
D. ingrica - Hackman, 1957
D. innubila - Spencer in Patterson, 1943
D. inopinata - Lachaise and Chassagnard, 2002
D. insignita - Hardy, 1965
D. insularis - Dobzhansky in Dobzhansky et al., 1957
D. inti - Cabezas, Llangari and Rafael, 2015
D. intillacta - Cabezas and Rafael, 2013
D. involuta - Hardy, 1965
D. iroko - Burla, 1954
D. ironensis - Bock and Parsons, 1978
D. ischnotrix - Hardy, 1965
D. itacorubi - Doge, Gottschalk and Valente, 2011
D. ivai - Vilela, 1983

J

D. jagri - Prakash and Reddy, 1979
D. jambiya - Grimaldi & Jones, 2020
D. jambulina - Parshad and Paika, 1964
D. johnstonae - Pipkin and Heed, 1964
D. joycei - Hardy, 1965
D. jucunda - Lamb, 1914

K

D. kahania - Magnacca and O'Grady, 2008
D. kallima - Wheeler, 1957
D. kambysellisi - Hardy and Kaneshiro, 1969
D. kanaka - Tsacas, 1988
D. kanapiae - Bock and Wheeler, 1972
D. kanekoi - Watabe and Higuchi, 1979
D. kaneshiroi - Hardy, 1977
D. karakasa - Watabe and Liang in Watabe et al., 1990
D. kasha - Penafiel and Rafael, 2019
D. kashmirensis - Kumar and Gupta, 1985
D. kauaiensis - Magnacca and O'Grady, 2008
D. kauluai - Bryan, 1934
D. kepulauana - Wheeler in Wilson et al., 1969
D. kerteszina - Duda, 1925
D. khansuensis - Singh, Dash and Fartyal, 2004
D. khaoyana - Bock and Wheeler, 1972
D. kikalaeleele - Lapoint, Magnacca and O'Grady, 2009
D. kikiko - Magnacca in Magnacca and Price, 2012
D. kikkawai - Burla, 1954
D. kilimanjarica - Lachaise and Chassagnard, 2001
D. kinabaluana - Takada, Momma and Shima, 1973
D. kinoole - Magnacca in Magnacca and Price, 2012
D. kitagawai - Toda, 1986
D. kitumensis - Tsacas in Tsacas et al., 1985
D. kivuensis - Tsacas, 1980
D. koepferae - Fontdevila and Wasserman in Fontdevila et al., 1988
D. kohkoa - Wheeler in Wilson et al., 1969
D. kokeensis - Hardy, 1966
D. komohana - Magnacca and O'Grady, 2009
D. konaensis - Magnacca and O'Grady, 2008
D. korefae - Vela and Rafael, 2004
D. kraussi - Hardy, 1965
D. krimbasi - Tsacas in Tsacas et al., 1985
D. krugi - Pavan and Breuer, 1954
D. kualapa - Magnacca and O'Grady, 2008
D. kualii - Magnacca and O'Grady, 2009
D. kuhao - Magnacca and O'Grady, 2008
D. kulango - Burla, 1954
D. kulouriensis - Fartyal and Singh in Brake and Bachli, 2008
D. kulouriensis - Fartyal and Singh, 2007
D. kulouriensis - Fartyal and Singh, 2007
D. kuntzei - Duda, 1924
D. kuoni - Burla, 1954
D. kurillakta - Penafiel and Rafael, 2019
D. kurseongensis - Gupta and Singh, 1977
D. kweichowensis - Tan, Hsu and Sheng, 1949

L

D. lacertosa - Okada, 1956
D. lachaisei - Tsacas, 1984
D. lacicola - Patterson, 1944
D. laciniosa - Hardy, 1965
D. lacteicornis - Okada, 1965
D. lamellitarsis - Duda, 1936
D. lamottei - Tsacas, 1980
D. lanaiensis - Grimshaw, 1901
D. larifuga - Hardy, 1965
D. lasiopoda - Hardy and Kaneshiro, 1975
D. latebuccata - Duda, 1927
D. latecarinata - Duda, 1927
D. latifrons - Adams, 1905
D. latifshahi - Gupta and Ray-Chaudhuri, 1970
D. latigena - Hardy, 1965
D. latipaenula - Okada and Carson, 1982
D. lauoho - Magnacca and O'Grady, 2008
D. lauta - Wheeler and Takada in Wheeler et al., 1962
D. lehrmanae - Madi-Ravazzi et al., 2021
D. lelolua - Magnacca and O'Grady, 2009
D. lemniscata - Hardy, 1965
D. leoni - Pipkin, 1964
D. leonis - Patterson and Wheeler, 1942
D. leontia - Tsacas and David, 1977
D. lepidobregma - Hardy, 1965
D. leticiae - Pipkin, 1967
D. leukorrhyna - Pipkin, 1964
D. levii - Tsacas, 1988
D. liae - Toda and Peng, 1989
D. libellulosa - Tsacas and Legrand, 1979
D. lichuanensis - Zhang and Liang, 1995
D. limbata - von Roser, 1840
D. limbinervis - Duda, 1925
D. limbiventris - Duda, 1925
D. limensis - Pavan and Patterson in Pavan and da Cunha, 1947
D. limingi - Gao, Watabe, Toda, Zhang and Aotsuka, 2003
D. limitata - Hardy and Kaneshiro, 1968
D. lindae - Wheeler, 1968
D. linearepleta - Patterson and Wheeler, 1942
D. linearidentata - Toda, 1986
D. linearis - Walker, 1852
D. lineata - van der Wulp, 1881
D. lineolata - de Meijere, 1914
D. lineosetae - Hardy and Kaneshiro, 1968
D. lini - Bock and Wheeler, 1972
D. liophallus - Hardy and Kaneshiro, 1968
D. lissodora - Hardy and Kaneshiro in Hardy et al., 2001
D. littoralis - Meigen, 1830
D. liui - Chen, 1988
D. lividinervis - Duda, 1923
D. lobatopalpus - Kam and Pereira in O'Grady et al., 2003
D. loewi - Vilela and Bächli, 2000
D. loiciana - Tsacas and Chassagnard, 2000
D. longicornis - Patterson and Wheeler, 1942
D. longicrinis - Lachaise and Chassagnard, 2002
D. longifrons - Duda, 1923
D. longipalpus - Magnacca and O'Grady, 2008
D. longipectinata - Takada, Momma and Shima, 1973
D. longiperda - Kambysellis, 1993
D. longiserrata - Toda, 1988
D. longiseta - Grimshaw, 1901
D. longisetae - Zhang, Lin and Gan, 1990
D. longissima - Okada and Carson, 1983
D. longitarsis - Duda, 1931
D. lowei - Heed, Crumpacker and Ehrman, 1968
D. lucipennis - Lin in Bock and Wheeler, 1972
D. lugubripennis - Duda, 1927
D. luguensis - Gao, Watabe, Toda, Zhang and Aotsuka, 2003
D. luisserrai - Vilela and Bächli, 2002
D. lummei - Hackman, 1972
D. lusaltans - Magalhaes, 1962
D. luteola - Hardy, 1965
D. lutescens - Okada, 1975
D. lutzii - Sturtevant, 1916

M

D. machachensis - Vela and Rafael, 2001
D. machalilla - Acurio Rafael, Cespedes and Ruiz, 2013
D. macquarti - Wheeler, 1981
D. macrochaetae - Hardy, 1965
D. macropolia - Patterson and Mainland, 1944
D. macroptera - Patterson and Wheeler, 1942
D. macrospina - Stalker and Spencer, 1939
D. macrothrix - Hardy and Kaneshiro, 1968
D. maculifrons - Duda, 1927
D. maculinotata - Okada, 1956
D. madeirensis - Monclus, 1984
D. madikerii - Muniyappa and Reddy, 1981
D. maemae - Kam and Pereira in O'Grady et al., 2003
D. magalhaesi - Mourao and Bicudo, 1967
D. maggulae - Gupta and Sundaran, 1990
D. magnabadia - Patterson and Mainland in Patterson, 1943
D. magnaquinaria - Wheeler, 1954
D. magnimacula - Hardy, 1965
D. magnipalpa - Hardy, 1965
D. mahui - Magnacca and O'Grady, 2008
D. mainlandi - Patterson, 1943
D. majtoi - Ruiz-Fiegalan, 2003
D. makawao - Magnacca and O'Grady, 2008
D. malagassya - Tsacas and Rafael, 1982
D. malagasy - Grimaldi & Jones, 2020
D. malayana - (Takada, 1976)
D. malele - Magnacca and O'Grady, 2008
D. malerkotliana - Parshad and Paika, 1964
D. mambilla - Tsacas, 1980
D. mandibulata - Magnacca and O'Grady, 2009
D. mangabeirai - Malogolowkin, 1951
D. manni - Grimaldi, 2016
D. mapiriensis - Vilela and Bächli, 1990
D. maracaya - Wheeler, 1957
D. margarita - Hunter, 1979
D. mariaehelenae - Vilela, 1984
D. mariettae - Vilela, 1983
D. martensis - Wasserman and Wilson, 1957
D. martinsae - Correa et al., 2021
D. maryensis - Gupta and Dwivedi, 1980
D. matae - Tsacas, 1980
D. mathisi - Vilela, 1983
D. matileana - Tsacas, 2002
D. matilei - Tsacas, 1974
D. mauritiana - Tsacas and David, 1974
D. mawaena - Magnacca and O'Grady, 2008
D. maya - Heed and O'Grady, 2000
D. mayaguana - Vilela, 1983
D. mayri - Mather and Dobzhansky, 1962
D. mcclintockae - Pipkin, 1964
D. mecocnemia - Hardy, 1965
D. medialis - Hardy, 1966
D. mediana - Hardy, 1965
D. mediobandes - Dwivedi and Gupta, 1980
D. medioconstricta - Watabe, Zhang and Gan in Watabe et al., 1990
D. mediocris - Frota-Pessoa, 1954
D. mediodelta - Heed and Wheeler, 1957
D. mediodiffusa - Heed and Wheeler, 1957
D. medioimpressa - Frota-Pessoa, 1954
D. medioobscurata - Duda, 1925
D. medioparva - Heed and Wheeler, 1957
D. mediopicta - Frota-Pessoa, 1954
D. mediopictoides - Heed and Wheeler, 1957
D. mediopunctata - Dobzhansky and Pavan, 1943
D. mediosignata - Dobzhansky and Pavan, 1943
D. mediostriata - Duda, 1925
D. mediovittata - Frota-Pessoa, 1954
D. megalagitans - Wheeler and Magalhaes, 1962
D. megapyga - Tsacas, 1981
D. megaspis - Bezzi, 1908
D. megasticta - Hardy, 1965
D. meitanensis - Tan, Hsu and Sheng, 1949
D. melanica - Sturtevant, 1916
D. melanissima - Sturtevant, 1916
D. melanocephala - ardy, 1966
D. melanogaster - Meigen, 1830
D. melanoloma - Hardy, 1965
D. melanopedis - Hardy, 1965
D. melanoptera - Duda, 1927
D. melanosoma - Grimshaw, 1901
D. melanura - Miller, 1944
D. melina - Wheeler, 1962
D. mellea - Becker, 1919
D. mercatorum - Patterson and Wheeler, 1942
D. meridiana - Patterson and Wheeler, 1942
D. meridionalis - Wasserman, 1962
D. merina - Tsacas in Lemeunier et al., 1997
D. merzi - Vilela and Bächli, 2002
D. mesophragmatica - Duda, 1927
D. mesostigma - Frota-Pessoa, 1954
D. metasetigerata - Gupta and Kumar, 1986
D. mettleri - Heed, 1977
D. metzii - Sturtevant, 1921
D. mexicana - Macquart, 1843
D. mexiflora - Grimaldi, 2016
D. microdenticulata - Panigrahy and Gupta, 1983
D. microlabis - Seguy, 1938
D. micromelanica - Patterson in Sturtevant and Novitski, 1941
D. micromettleri - Heed, 1989
D. micromyia - Hardy and Kaneshiro, 1975
D. micropectinata - Takada and Momma, 1975
D. microralis - Tsacas in Tsacas and Lachaise, 1981
D. milleri - Magalhaes, 1962
D. milolii - Magnacca and O'Grady, 2008
D. mimetica - Bock and Wheeler, 1972
D. mimica - Hardy, 1965
D. mimiconformis - Hardy, 1965
D. mimiconfutata - Hardy, 1965
D. minangkabau - Zhang and Toda in Zhang, Toda and Watabe, 1995
D. minuta - Walker, 1852
D. miranda - Dobzhansky, 1935
D. misi - Penafiel and Rafael, 2018
D. mitchelli - Hardy, 1965
D. mitis - Curran, 1936
D. mojavensis - Patterson in Patterson and Crow, 1940
D. moju - Pavan, 1950
D. mojuoides - Wasserman, 1962
D. moli - Magnacca in Magnacca and Price, 2012
D. molokaiensis - Grimshaw, 1901
D. momortica - Graber, 1957
D. monieri - McEvey and Tsacas in McEvey et al., 1987
D. monochaeta - Sturtevant, 1927
D. monocolor - Wheeler, 1981
D. monsterae - Vilela and Prieto, 2018
D. montana - Patterson and Wheeler, 1942
D. montevidensis - Goni and Vilela, 2016
D. montgomeryi - Hardy and Kaneshiro, 1971
D. montium - de Meijere, 1916
D. morelia - Vilela and Bächli, 2004
D. morena - Frota-Pessoa, 1954
D. moriwakii - Okada and Kurokawa, 1957
D. mucunae - Okada and Carson, 1982
D. mukteshwarensis - Joshi, Fartyal and Singh, 2005
D. mulleri - Sturtevant, 1921
D. mulli - Perreira and Kaneshiro, 1991
D. multiciliata - Hardy and Kaneshiro in Hardy et al., 2001
D. multidentata - Watabe and Zhang in Watabe et al., 1990
D. multispina - Okada, 1956
D. munda - Spencer, 1942
D. murphyi - Hardy and Kaneshiro, 1969
D. musae - Hardy, 1965
D. musaphilia - Hardy, 1965
D. mutica - Toda, 1988
D. myamaungi - Toda, 1991
D. mycethophila - Goureau, 1865
D. mylenae - David and Yassin, in Yassin et al., 2019
D. mysorensis - Reddy and Krishnamurthy, 1970

N

D. nagarholensis - Prakash and Reddy, 1980
D. nainitalensis - Singh and Bhatt, 1988
D. nakanoi - Zhang and Toda in Zhang, Toda and Watabe, 1995
D. nalomano - Magnacca and O'Grady, 2009
D. nanella - Hardy, 1965
D. nannoptera - Wheeler, 1949
D. napoensis - Guillin and Rafael, 2015
D. nappae - Vilela, Valente and Basso-da-Silva, 2004
D. narragansett - Sturtevant and Dobzhansky, 1936
D. nasuta - Lamb, 1914
D. nasutoides - Okada, 1964
D. natasha - Gornostayev, 1992
D. navojoa - Ruiz, Heed and Wasserman in Ruiz et al., 1990
D. nebulosa - Sturtevant, 1916
D. neoalagitans - Wheeler and Magalhaes, 1962
D. neoamaguana - Guillin and Rafael, 2017
D. neoasahinai - Watada and Kondo, in Watada et al., 2011
D. neoasiri - Figuero and Rafael, 2013
D. neobaimai - Singh and Dash, 1998
D. neobusckii - Toda, 1986
D. neocapnoptera - Figuero and Rafael, 2013
D. neocardini - Streisinger, 1946
D. neochracea - Wheeler, 1959
D. neoclavisetae - Perreira and Kaneshiro, 1991
D. neocordata - Magalhaes, 1956
D. neoelegans - Gupta and Singh, 1977
D. neoelliptica - Pavan and Magalhaes in Pavan, 1950
D. neogata - Lachaise and Chassagnard, 2001
D. neogrimshawi - Hardy and Kaneshiro, 1968
D. neoguaramunu - Frydenberg, 1956
D. neohydei - Wasserman, 1962
D. neohypocausta - Lin and Wheeler in Lin and Tseng, 1973
D. neoimmigrans - Gai and Krishnamurthy, 1982
D. neokadai - Kaneko and Takada, 1966
D. neokhaoyana - Singh and Dash, 1998
D. neokuntzei - Singh and Gupta, 1981
D. neolacteicornis - Hegde and Krishna in Hegde et al., 1999
D. neomitra - Chassagnard and Tsacas in Chassagnard et al., 1997
D. neomorpha - Heed and Wheeler, 1957
D. neonasuta - Sajjan and Krishnamurthy, 1972
D. neoperkinsi - Hardy and Kaneshiro, 1968
D. neopicta - Hardy and Kaneshiro, 1968
D. neoprosaltans - Guillin and Rafael, 2017
D. neorepleta - Patterson and Wheeler, 1942
D. neosaltans - Pavan and Magalhaes in Pavan, 1950
D. neosignata - Kumar and Gupta, 1988
D. neotestacea - Grimaldi, James and Jaenike, 1992
D. neotrapezifrons - Ranganath, Krishnamurthy and Hegde, 1983
D. neoyanayuyu - Guillin and Rafael, 2017
D. nepalensis - Okada, 1955
D. nesiota - Wheeler and Takada in Wheeler et al., 1962
D. nesoetes - Bock and Wheeler, 1972
D. neutralis - Hardy, 1965
D. ngemba - Tsacas, 1980
D. nigella - Hardy, 1965
D. nigra - Grimshaw, 1901
D. nigrasplendens - Pipkin, 1964
D. nigrialata - Takada, Momma and Shima, 1973
D. nigribasis - Hardy, 1969
D. nigriceps - Meigen, 1838
D. nigricincta - Frota-Pessoa, 1954
D. nigricruria - Patterson and Mainland in Patterson, 1943
D. nigriculter - Okada, 1988
D. nigridentata - Watabe, Toda and Peng in Zhang, Toda and Watabe, 1995
D. nigrifemur - Duda, 1927
D. nigrilineata - Angus, 1967
D. nigripalpus - Hardy, 1965
D. nigritarsus - Hardy, 1965
D. nigrocirrus - Hardy, 1965
D. nigrodigita - (Lin and Ting, 1971)
D. nigrodumosa - Wasserman and Fontdevila in Fontdevila et al., 1990
D. nigrodunni - Heed and Wheeler, 1957
D. nigrohydei - Patterson and Wheeler, 1942
D. nigromaculata - Kikkawa and Peng, 1938
D. nigromelanica - Patterson and Wheeler, 1942
D. nigropleuralis - Takada, Momma and Shima, 1973
D. nigropolita - Hardy, 1965
D. nigrosaltans - Magalhaes, 1962
D. nigrosparsa - Strobl, 1898
D. nigrospinipes - Grimaldi & Jones, 2020
D. nigrospiracula - Patterson and Wheeler, 1942
D. nigua - Cabezas, Llangari and Rafael, 2015
D. nikananu - Burla, 1954
D. nina - Cabezas and Rafael, 2015
D. ninarumi - Vela and Rafael, 2005
D. nitida - Tsacas and Chassagnard, 1994
D. nitidapex - Bigot, 1891
D. niveifrons - Okada and Carson, 1982
D. nixifrons - Tan, Hsu and Sheng, 1949
D. nodosa - Duda, 1926
D. notostriata - Okada, 1966
D. novamexicana - Patterson, 1941
D. novaspinofera - Gupta and Singh, 1979
D. novazonata - Gupta and Dwivedi, 1980
D. novemaristata - Dobzhansky and Pavan, 1943
D. novitskii - Sulerud and Miller, 1966
D. nubiluna - Wheeler, 1949
D. nukea - Magnacca in Magnacca and Price, 2012
D. nullilineata - Zhang and Toda, 1988
D. nutrita - Duda, 1935
D. nyinyii - Toda, 1991

O

D. oahuensis - rimshaw, 1901
D. obatai - Hardy and Kaneshiro, 1972
D. obscura - Fallen, 1823
D. obscurata - de Meijere, 1911
D. obscuricolor - Duda, 1927
D. obscurinervis - Toda, 1986
D. obscuripes - rimshaw, 1901
D. ocampoae - Ruiz-Fiegalan, 2003
D. occidentalis - Spencer, 1942
D. ocellata - Hardy and Kaneshiro, 1969
D. ochracea - Grimshaw, 1901
D. ochrifrons - Duda, 1924
D. ochrobasis - Hardy and Kaneshiro, 1968
D. ochrogaster - Chassagnard in Chassagnard and Groseille, 1992
D. ochropleura - Hardy and Kaneshiro in Hardy et al., 2001
D. odontophallus - Hardy and Kaneshiro, 1968
D. ogradi - Vela and Rafael, 2004
D. ogumai - Zannat and Toda, 2002
D. ohnishii - Zannat and Toda, 2002
D. okadai - Takada, 1959
D. okala - Magnacca and O'Grady, 2008
D. olaae - Grimshaw, 1901
D. omnivora - Magnacca and O'Grady, 2009
D. onca - Dobzhansky and Pavan, 1943
D. onychophora - Duda, 1927
D. ophthalmitis - Tsacas, 2007
D. opuhe - Magnacca in Magnacca and Price, 2012
D. orascopa - Magnacca and O'Grady, 2009
D. oreas - Hardy, 1965
D. oreia - Tsacas, 1980
D. orena - Tsacas and David, 1978
D. orestes - Hardy, 1965
D. oribatis - Tsacas, 1980
D. orientacea - Grimaldi, James and Jaenike, 1992
D. oritisa - Chen, 1990
D. orkui - Brncic and Koref-Santibanez, 1957
D. ornata - Meigen, 1830
D. ornata - Hardy and Kaneshiro, 1969
D. ornatifrons - Duda, 1927
D. ornatipennis - Williston, 1896
D. orosa - Bock and Wheeler, 1972
D. orphnaea - Tsacas, 2001
D. orphnopeza - Hardy and Kaneshiro, 1968
D. orthofascia - Hardy and Kaneshiro, 1968
D. orthophallata - Katoh, Toda and Gao, in Katoh et al., 2018
D. orthoptera - Hardy, 1965
D. oshimai - Choo and Nakamura, 1973
D. othoni - Pipkin, 1964
D. ovilongata - Gupta and Gupta, 1991

P

D. pachea - Patterson and Wheeler, 1942
D. pachneissa - Tsacas, 2002
D. pachuca - Wasserman, 1962
D. padangensis - Zhang and Toda in Zhang, Toda and Watabe, 1995
D. paenehamifera - Hardy and Kaneshiro, 1969
D. pagliolii - Cordeiro, 1963
D. pagoda - Toda, 1988
D. paharpaniensis - Singh, Dash and Fartyal, 2004
D. painii - Singh and Negi, 1995
D. pallidifrons - Wheeler in Wilson et al., 1969
D. pallidipennis - Dobzhansky and Pavan, 1943
D. pallidosa - Bock and Wheeler, 1972
D. pallipes - Dufour, 1846
D. palmata - Takada, Momma and Shima, 1973
D. palniensis - Hegde and Shakunthala in Hegde et al., 1999
D. palustris - Spencer, 1942
D. panamensis - Malloch, 1926
D. pandora - McEvey and Schiffer, 2015
D. panina - Magnacca and O'Grady, 2008
D. panoanoa - Magnacca and O'Grady, 2008
D. papaalai - Magnacca and O'Grady, 2008
D. papala - Magnacca and O'Grady, 2008
D. papallacta - Figuero and Rafael, 2013
D. papei - Bächli and Vilela, 2002
D. papilla - Zhang and Shi in Zhang and Toda, 1992
D. pappobolusae - Figuero, Leon, Rafael and Cespedes, 2012
D. paraanthrax - Hardy and Kaneshiro in Hardy et al., 2001
D. parabipectinata - Bock, 1971
D. parabocainensis - Carson, 1954
D. paracanalinea - Wheeler, 1957
D. parachrogaster - Patterson and Mainland in Patterson, 1943
D. paracracens - Hardy and Kaneshiro, 1979
D. paragata - Lachaise and Chassagnard, 2001
D. paraguayensis - Duda, 1927
D. paraguttata - Thompson in Wheeler, 1957
D. paraimmigrans - Gai and Krishnamurthy, 1986
D. paraitacorubi - Doge, Gottschalk and Valente, 2011
D. parakuntzei - Okada, 1973
D. paralongifera - Gupta and Singh, 1981
D. paralutea - Bock and Wheeler, 1972
D. paramanni - Grimaldi, 2016
D. paramarginata - Singh, Dash and Fartyal, 2004
D. paramediostriata - Townsend and Wheeler, 1955
D. paramelanica - Patterson, 1943
D. paramelanica - Griffen, 1942
D. paramelanica - Patterson, 1942
D. paranaensis - Barros, 1950
D. parannularis - Vilela and Bächli, 1990
D. parapallidosa - Tobari, in Matsuda and Tobari, 2009
D. parasaltans - Magalhaes, 1956
D. parasignata - Takada, Momma and Shima, 1973
D. paratarsata - Vilela, 1985
D. paraviaristata - Takada, Momma and Shima, 1973
D. paravibrissina - Duda, 1924
D. parazonata - Gupta and Dwivedi, 1980
D. parisiena - Heed and Grimaldi, 1991
D. parthenogenetica - Stalker, 1953
D. parviprocessata - Toda, 1986
D. parvula - Bock and Wheeler, 1972
D. pasochoensis - Vela and Rafael, 2001
D. patacorona - Vela and Rafael, 2005
D. paucicilia - Hardy and Kaneshiro, 1971
D. paucilineata - Burla, 1957
D. paucipuncta - Grimshaw, 1901
D. paucitarsus - Hardy and Kaneshiro, 1979
D. paucula - Hardy, 1965
D. pauliceia - Ratcov and Vilela, 2007
D. paulistorum - Dobzhansky and Pavan in Burla et al., 1949
D. paunii - Singh and Negi, 1989
D. pavani - Brncic, 1957
D. pavlovskiana - Kastritsis and Dobzhansky, 1967
D. pectinifera - Wheeler and Takada, 1964
D. pectinitarsus - Hardy, 1965
D. pedroi - Vilela, 1984
D. pegasa - Wasserman, 1962
D. peixotoi - Vaz, Vilela and Carvalho, 2018
D. pellewae - Pipkin and Heed, 1964
D. peloristoma - Magnacca and O'Grady, 2009
D. penicillipennis - Takada, Momma and Shima, 1973
D. peniculipedis - Hardy, 1965
D. penidentata - Singh and Gupta, 1981
D. peninsularis - Patterson and Wheeler, 1942
D. penispina - Grimaldi, 2016
D. penispina - Gupta and Singh, 1979
D. pennae - Bock and Wheeler, 1972
D. penniclubata - Singh and Gupta, 1981
D. pentafuscata - Gupta and Kumar, 1986
D. pentaspina - Parshad and Duggal, 1966
D. pentastriata - Okada, 1966
D. percnosoma - Hardy, 1965
D. pereirai - Takada, Momma and Shima, 1973
D. periquito - Bächli and Vilela, 2002
D. perissopoda - Hardy, 1965
D. perlucida - Zhang and Liang, 1995
D. perrisi - Wheeler and Hamilton, 1972
D. persicae - Bock and Parsons, 1978
D. persimilis - Dobzhansky and Epling, 1944
D. peruensis - group Ratcov and Vilela, 2007
D. peruensis - Wheeler, 1959
D. peruviana - Duda, 1927
D. petalopeza - Hardy, 1965
D. petitae - Tsacas in Tsacas and Lachaise, 1981
D. phaeopleura - Bock and Wheeler, 1972
D. phalerata - Meigen, 1830
D. phalloserra - Grimaldi & Jones, 2020
D. phyale - Tsacas, 1981
D. picea - Hardy, 1978
D. pichinchana - Vela and Rafael, 2004
D. picta - Zetterstedt, 1847
D. picticornis - Grimshaw, 1901
D. pictifrons - Duda, 1927
D. pictilis - Wasserman, 1962
D. pictura - Wasserman, 1962
D. pihulu - Magnacca in Magnacca and Price, 2012
D. pilacrinis - Lachaise and Chassagnard, 2002
D. pilaresae - Vela and Rafael, 2001
D. pilatisetae - Hardy and Kaneshiro, 1968
D. pilimana - Grimshaw, 1901
D. pilipa - Magnacca in Magnacca and Price, 2012
D. pilocornuta - Lachaise and Chassagnard, 2001
D. pilosa - Watabe and Peng, 1991
D. pinicola - Sturtevant, 1942
D. pinnitarsus - Bock, 1976
D. piratininga - Ratcov and Vilela, 2007
D. pisonia - Hardy and Kaneshiro, 1971
D. pittieri - Bächli and Vilela, 2002
D. plagiata - Bezzi, 1908
D. planitibia - ardy, 1966
D. platitarsus - Frota-Pessoa, 1954
D. plumosa - Grimshaw, 1901
D. podocarpus - Penafiel and Rafael, 2019
D. pohaka - Magnacca and O'Grady, 2008
D. poinari - Grimaldi, 1987
D. polita - Grimshaw, 1901
D. polliciforma - Hardy, 1965
D. pollinospadix - Patterson and Mainland, 1944
D. polychaeta - Patterson and Wheeler, 1942
D. polymorpha - Dobzhansky and Pavan, 1943
D. ponderosa - Patterson and Mainland in Patterson, 1943
D. ponera - Tsacas and David, 1975
D. poonia - Magnacca and O'Grady, 2008
D. popayan - Vilela and Bächli, 2004
D. populi - Wheeler and Throckmorton, 1961
D. potamophila - Toda and Peng, 1989
D. praesutilis - Hardy, 1965
D. prashadi - Brunetti, 1923
D. preapicula - Hardy, 1965
D. pretiosa - Hardy, 1965
D. primaeva - Hardy and Kaneshiro, 1968
D. procardinoides - Frydenberg, 1956
D. proceriseta - Hardy, 1965
D. prodispar - Parsons and Bock in Bock, 1982
D. prodita - Hardy, 1965
D. progastor - Bock, 1976
D. prolaticilia - Hardy, 1965
D. prolixa - Hardy, 1965
D. prolongata - Singh and Gupta, 1978
D. promeridiana - Wasserman, 1962
D. prominens - Hardy, 1965
D. propachuca - Wasserman, 1962
D. propiofacies - Hardy, 1965
D. prorepleta - Duda, 1925
D. prosaltans - Duda, 1927
D. prosimilis - Duda, 1927
D. prostipennis - Lin in Bock and Wheeler, 1972
D. prostopalpis - Hardy and Kaneshiro, 1968
D. pruinifacies - Frota-Pessoa, 1954
D. pruinosa - Duda, 1940
D. pseudoananassae - Bock, 1971
D. pseudoargentostriata - Wheeler, 1981
D. pseudobaimaii - Takada, Momma and Shima, 1973
D. pseudobocainensis - Wheeler and Magalhaes, 1962
D. pseudodenticulata - Takada and Momma, 1975
D. pseudomayri - Baimai, 1970
D. pseudoobscura - Frolova in Frolova and Astaurov, 1929
D. pseudorepleta - Vilela and Bächli, 1990
D. pseudosaltans - Magalhaes, 1956
D. pseudosordidula - Kaneko, Tokumitsu and Takada, 1964
D. pseudotakahashii - Mather, 1957
D. pseudotalamancana - Pereira and Vilela, 1987
D. pseudotetrachaeta - Angus, 1967
D. psilophallus - Hardy and Kaneshiro, 1971
D. psilotarsalis - Hardy and Kaneshiro, 1975
D. pterocelis - Tsacas and Chassagnard, 1999
D. puberula - Katoh and Gao, in Katoh et al., 2018
D. pugyu - Vela and Rafael, 2005
D. pulaua - Wheeler in Wilson et al., 1969
D. pulchella - Sturtevant, 1916
D. pulchrella - Tan, Hsu and Sheng, 1949
D. pullata - Tan, Hsu and Sheng, 1949
D. pullipes - Hardy and Kaneshiro, 1972
D. pulverea - Duda, 1927
D. punalua - Bryan, 1934
D. punctatipennis - Tsacas and David, 1975
D. punctatonervosa - Frey, 1954
D. punjabiensis - Parshad and Paika, 1964
D. purpurea - Gupta and Sundaran, 1990
D. putrida - Sturtevant, 1916
D. pychnochaetae - Hardy, 1965
D. pyo - Toda, 1991

Q

D. qiongzhouensis  - Katoh and Gao, in Katoh et al., 2018
D. quadrangula - Gao & Toda, in Gao, Tanabe & Toda, 2009
D. quadraria - Bock and Wheeler, 1972
D. quadrilineata - de Meijere, 1911
D. quadriseriata - Duda, 1924
D. quadriserrata - Okada and Carson, 1982
D. quadrisetae - Hardy, 1965
D. quadrisetata - Takada, Beppu and Toda, 1979
D. quadrum - (Wiedemann, 1830)
D. quasianomalipes - Hardy, 1965
D. quasiexpansa - Hardy, 1965
D. quatrou - Tsacas, 1980
D. querubimae - Vilela, 1983
D. quijos - Guillin and Rafael, 2015
D. quillu - Vela and Rafael, 2005
D. quinaria - Loew, 1866
D. quinarensis - Penafiel and Rafael, 2018
D. quinqueannulata - Frey, 1917
D. quinqueramosa - Hardy and Kaneshiro in Hardy et al., 2001
D. quinquestriata - Lin and Wheeler in Lin and Tseng, 1973
D. quitensis - Vela and Rafael, 2004

R

D. racemova - Patterson and Mainland, 1944
D. ramamensis - Dwivedi, 1979
D. ramsdeni - Sturtevant, 1916
D. ranchograndensis - Bächli and Vilela, 2002
D. reaumurii - Dufour, 1845
D. recens - Wheeler, 1960
D. rectangularis - Sturtevant, 1942
D. recticilia - Hardy and Kaneshiro, 1968
D. redunca - Hardy, 1965
D. rellima - Wheeler, 1960
D. repleta - Wollaston, 1858
D. repletoides - Hsu, 1943
D. reschae - Hardy and Kaneshiro, 1975
D. residua - Hardy, 1965
D. reticulata - Wheeler, 1957
D. retnasabapathyi - Takada and Momma, 1975
D. retrusa - Hardy, 1965
D. reynoldsiae - Hardy and Kaneshiro, 1972
D. rhombura - Okada and Carson, 1983
D. rhopaloa - Bock and Wheeler, 1972
D. richardsoni - Vilela, 1983
D. rinjaniensis - Suwito and Watabe, in Suwito, Watabe and Toda, 2013
D. ritae - Patterson and Wheeler, 1942
D. robusta - Sturtevant, 1916
D. roehrae - Pipkin and Heed, 1964
D. rosinae - Vilela, 1983
D. rostrata - Duda, 1925
D. ruberrima - de Meijere, 1911
D. ruberrimoides - Zhang and Gan, 1986
D. rubida - Mather, 1960
D. rubidifrons - Patterson and Mainland, 1944
D. rubra - Sturtevant, 1927
D. rubrifrons - Patterson and Wheeler, 1942
D. rucux - Cespedes and Rafael, 2012
D. rufa - Kikkawa and Peng, 1938
D. ruizi - Ruiz-Fiegalan, 2004
D. ruminahuii - Vela and Rafael, 2004
D. rumipamba - Vela and Rafael, 2005
D. runduloma - Vela and Rafael, 2005
D. rustica - Hardy, 1965

S

D. sabroskyi - Hardy, 1965
D. sachapuyu - Penafiel and Rafael, 2018
D. sadleria - Bryan, 1938
D. sahyadrii - Prakash and Reddy, 1979
D. salpina - Chen, 1994
D. saltans - Sturtevant, 1916
D. sampa - Ratcov and Vilela, 2007
D. sampagensis - Muniyappa and Reddy, 1980
D. sannio - Gornostayev, 1991
D. santomea - Lachaise and Harry in Lachaise et al., 2000
D. saraguru - Penafiel and Rafael, 2019
D. saraswati - Singh and Dash, 1998
D. sargakhetensis - Joshi, Fartyal and Singh, 2005
D. scaptomyzoptera - Duda, 1935
D. schachti - Bächli, Vilela and Haring, 2002
D. schildi - Malloch, 1924
D. schineri - Pereira and Vilela, 1987
D. schmidti - Duda, 1924
D. schugi - McEvey and Schiffer, 2015
D. scioptera - Duda, 1927
D. scitula - Hardy, 1966
D. scolostoma - Hardy, 1965
D. scopata - Bock, 1976
D. sechellia - Tsacas and Bächli, 1981
D. seclusa - Hardy, 1965
D. secunda - Maca, 1992
D. seguyi - Smart, 1945
D. seguyiana - Chassagnard and Tsacas in Chassagnard et al., 1997
D. sejuncta - Hardy and Kaneshiro, 1968
D. semialba - Duda, 1925
D. semiatra - de Meijere, 1914
D. semifuscata - Hardy, 1965
D. seminole - Sturtevant and Dobzhansky, 1936
D. semipruinosa - Tsacas, 2002
D. senei - Vilela, 1983
D. senilis - Duda, 1926
D. senticosa - Zhang and Shi in Zhang, Toda and Watabe, 1995
D. seorsa - Hardy, 1965
D. septacoila - Gai and Krishnamurthy, 1984
D. septentriosaltans - Magalhaes and Buck in Magalhaes, 1962
D. serenensis - Brncic, 1957
D. serido - Vilela and Sene, 1977
D. seriema - Tidon-Sklorz and Sene, 1995
D. serrata - Malloch, 1927
D. serripaenula - Okada and Carson, 1982
D. serrula - Tsacas, 1984
D. serrulata - Zhang and Toda in Zhang, Toda and Watabe, 1995
D. setapex - Patterson and Mainland, 1944
D. setifemur - Malloch, 1924
D. setiger - Grimshaw, 1901
D. setipalpus - Hardy, 1965
D. setitarsa - Gupta and Dwivedi, 1980
D. setosifrons - Hardy and Kaneshiro, 1968
D. setosimentum - Hardy and Kaneshiro, 1968
D. setositibia - Hardy and Kaneshiro in Hardy et al., 2001
D. setula - Heed and Wheeler, 1957
D. sevensteri - Grimaldi, 2016
D. sexlineata - Duda, 1940
D. seyanii - Chassagnard and Tsacas in Chassagnard et al., 1997
D. sharpi - Grimshaw, 1901
D. shi - Zhang, 2000
D. shuyu - Vela and Rafael, 2005
D. shwezayana - Toda, 1986
D. shyri - Vela and Rafael, 2004
D. siamana - Hihara and Lin, 1984
D. siamana - Ikeda et al., 1983
D. siangensis - Kumar and Gupta, 1988
D. sierrae - Ruiz-Fiegalan, 2003
D. sigmoides - Loew, 1872
D. signata - (Duda, 1923)
D. sikkimensis - Gupta and Gupta, 1991
D. silvarentis - Hardy and Kaneshiro, 1968
D. silvata - de Meijere, 1916
D. silvestris - erkins, 1910
D. similis - Williston, 1896
D. simulans - Sturtevant, 1919
D. simulivora - Tsacas and Disney, 1974
D. sinobscura - Watabe in Watabe et al., 1996
D. sinuata - Bock, 1982
D. sisa - Vela and Rafael, 2005
D. sisapamba - Figuero, Leon, Rafael and Cespedes, 2012
D. smithersi - Bock, 1976
D. sobrina - Hardy and Kaneshiro, 1971
D. sodomae - Hardy and Kaneshiro, 1968
D. sogo - Burla, 1954
D. solennis - Walker, 1860
D. solstitialis - Chen, 1994
D. sonorae - Heed and Castrezana, 2008
D. soonae - Takada and Yoon, 1989
D. sordidapex - Grimshaw, 1901
D. sordidula - Kikkawa and Peng, 1938
D. spadicifrons - Patterson and Mainland, 1944
D. spaniothrix - Hardy and Kaneshiro, 1968
D. speciosa - da Silva and Martins, 2004
D. spectabilis - Hardy, 1965
D. spenceri - Patterson, 1943
D. sphaerocera - Thomson, 1869
D. spicula - Hardy, 1965
D. spiethi - Hardy, 1966
D. spinatermina - Heed and Wheeler, 1957
D. spinula - Okada and Carson, 1982
D. sproati - Hardy and Kaneshiro, 1968
D. spuricurviceps - Zhang and Gan, 1986
D. stalkeri - Wheeler, 1954
D. starki - Grimaldi, 2016
D. starmeri - Wasserman, Koepfer and Ward, 1973
D. statzi - Ashburner and Bächli, 2004
D. stenoptera - Hardy, 1965
D. stenotrichala - Lachaise and Chassagnard, 2002
D. stephanosi - Tsacas, 2003
D. sternopleuralis - Okada and Kurokawa, 1957
D. sticta - Wheeler, 1957
D. stictoptera - Tsacas and Chassagnard, 1999
D. stigma - Hardy, 1977
D. straubae - Heed and Grimaldi, 1991
D. strigiventris - Duda, 1927
D. sturtevanti - Duda, 1927
D. stylipennis - Grimaldi, 2016
D. subarctica - Hackman, 1969
D. subauraria - Kimura, 1983
D. subbadia - Patterson and Mainland in Patterson, 1943
D. subelegans - Okada, 1988
D. subfasciata - de Meijere, 1914
D. subfunebris - Stalker and Spencer, 1939
D. subinfumata - Duda, 1925
D. submacroptera - Patterson and Mainland in Patterson, 1943
D. subobscura - Collin in Gordon, 1936
D. suboccidentalis - Spencer, 1942
D. subopaca - Hardy and Kaneshiro in Hardy et al., 2001
D. suborosa - Kumar and Gupta, 1992
D. subpalustris - Spencer, 1942
D. subpulchrella - Takamori and Watabe in Takamori, Watabe, Fuyama, Zhang and Aotsuka, 2006
D. subsaltans - Magalhaes, 1956
D. subsilvestris - Hardy & Kaneshiro, 1968
D. substenoptera - Hardy, 1969
D. subviridis - Patterson and Mainland in Patterson, 1943
D. succini - Grimaldi, 1987
D. sucinea - Patterson and Mainland, 1944
D. suffusca - Spencer in Patterson, 1943
D. sui - Lin and Tseng, 1973
D. sulfurigaster - (Duda, 1923)
D. sundaensis - Suwito and Watabe, in Suwito, Watabe and Toda, 2013
D. suni - Vela and Rafael, 2005
D. surangensis - Singh, Dash and Fartyal, 2004
D. surucucho - Vela and Rafael, 2005
D. suturalis - Wheeler, 1957
D. suzukii - (Matsumura, 1931)
D. swezeyi - Hardy, 1965
D. sycophaga - Tsacas in Tsacas and Lachaise, 1981
D. sycophila - Tsacas in Tsacas and Lachaise, 1981
D. sycovora - Tsacas in Tsacas and Lachaise, 1981
D. synpanishi - Okada, 1964
D. systenopeza - Hardy and Kaneshiro, 1979

T

D. taekjuni - Kim and Joo, 2002
D. taeniata - Hardy, 1965
D. taiensis - Kumar and Gupta, 1988
D. taipinsanensis - Lin and Tseng, 1973
D. takahashii - Sturtevant, 1927
D. talamancana - Wheeler, 1968
D. talasica - Gornostayev, 1991
D. tamashiroi - Hardy, 1965
D. tani - Cheng and Okada, 1985
D. tanorum - Okada, 1964
D. tanytarsis - Hardy and Kaneshiro in Hardy et al., 2001
D. tanythrix - Hardy, 1965
D. taractica - Hardy, 1965
D. tarphytrichia - Hardy, 1965
D. tarsalis - Walker, 1852
D. tarsata - Schiner, 1868
D. taxohuaycu - Vela and Rafael, 2005
D. teissieri - Tsacas, 1971
D. tendomentum - Hardy, 1965
D. tenebrosa - Spencer in Patterson, 1943
D. tenuipes - (Walker, 1849)
D. teratos - Bock, 1982
D. teresae - Pradhan and Sati, in Pradhan et al., 2015
D. testacea - von Roser, 1840
D. testacens - Wheeler, 1981
D. tetrachaeta - Angus, 1964
D. tetradentata - Singh and Gupta, 1981
D. tetraspilota - Hardy, 1965
D. tetravittata - Takada and Momma, 1975
D. thienemanni - Duda, 1931
D. thurstoni - Grimaldi, 2016
D. tibialis - Wheeler, 1957
D. tibudu - Burla, 1954
D. tjibodas - de Meijere, 1916
D. tolteca - Patterson and Mainland, 1944
D. tomasi - Vela and Rafael, 2001
D. tongpua - Lin and Tseng, 1973
D. torquata - Zhang and Toda in Zhang, Toda and Watabe, 1995
D. torrei - Sturtevant, 1921
D. torula - Hardy, 1965
D. totonigra - Hardy, 1965
D. touchardiae - Hardy and Kaneshiro, 1972
D. toxacantha - Magnacca and O'Grady, 2009
D. toxochaeta - Perreira and Kaneshiro, 1991
D. toyohii - Lin and Tseng, 1972
D. tranquilla - Spencer in Patterson, 1943
D. transfuga - Hardy, 1965
D. transversa - Fallen, 1823
D. trapeza - Heed and Wheeler, 1957
D. trapezifrons - Okada, 1966
D. triangula - Wheeler, 1949
D. triangulina - Duda, 1927
D. triantilia - Okada, 1988
D. triauraria - Bock and Wheeler, 1972
D. trichaeta - Angus, 1967
D. trichaetosa - Hardy, 1965
D. trichala - Lachaise and Chassagnard, 2002
D. trichiaspis - Duda, 1940
D. tricombata - Singh and Gupta, 1977
D. trifiloides - Wheeler, 1957
D. trifilum - Frota-Pessoa, 1954
D. trilimbata - Bezzi, 1928
D. trilutea - Bock and Wheeler, 1972
D. tripunctata - Loew, 1862
D. trisetosa - Okada, 1966
D. trispina - Wheeler, 1949
D. tristani - Sturtevant, 1921
D. tristipennis - Duda, 1924
D. tristipes - Duda, 1924
D. tristis - Fallen, 1823
D. tristriata - Heed and Wheeler, 1957
D. trizonata - Okada, 1966
D. tropicalis - Burla and da Cunha in Burla et al., 1949
D. truncata - Okada, 1964
D. truncipenna - Hardy, 1965
D. tsacasi - Bock and Wheeler, 1972
D. tsachila - Llangari & Rafael, 2020
D. tschirnhausi - Bächli and Vilela, 2002
D. tsigana - Burla and Gloor, 1952
D. tsukubaensis - Takamori and Okada, 1983
D. tuchaua - Pavan, 1950
D. tucumana - Vilela and Pereira, 1985
D. turbata - Hardy and Kaneshiro, 1969
D. tychaea - Tsacas in Tsacas and Lachaise, 1981

U

D. umiumi - Magnacca and O'Grady, 2009
D. ungarensis - de Meijere, 1911
D. unguicula - Okada and Carson, 1983
D. unicolor - (Walker, 1864)
D. unicula - Hardy, 1965
D. unimaculata - Strobl, 1893
D. uninubes - Patterson and Mainland in Patterson, 1943
D. unipectinata - Duda, 1924
D. unipunctata - Patterson and Mainland in Patterson, 1943
D. uniseriata - Hardy and Kaneshiro, 1968
D. uniseta - Wasserman, Koepfer and Ward, 1973
D. unispina - Okada, 1956
D. upoluae - Malloch, 1934
D. urcu - Vela and Rafael, 2005
D. urubamba - Vilela and Pereira, 1993
D. ustulata - de Meijere, 1908

V

D. valenciai - Vela and Rafael, 2001
D. vallismaia - Tsacas, 1984
D. vanderlindei - Ruiz-Fiegalan, 2004
D. varga - Hardy, 1965
D. variabilis - Hardy, 1965
D. varians - Bock and Wheeler, 1972
D. varipennis - Grimshaw, 1901
D. velascoi - Ruiz-Fiegalan, 2003
D. velata - Hardy, 1965
D. velox - Watabe and Peng, 1991
D. velutinifrons - Hardy, 1965
D. venezolana - Wasserman, Fontdevila, and Ruiz, 1983
D. venusta - Hardy, 1965
D. verbesinae - Figuero, Leon, Rafael and Cespedes, 2012
D. verticis - Williston, 1896
D. vesciseta - Hardy and Kaneshiro, 1968
D. vicentinae - Vilela, 1983
D. villitibia - Hardy, 1965
D. villosa - Hardy, 1965
D. villosipedis - Hardy, 1965
D. vinnula - Hardy, 1965
D. viracochi - Brncic and Koref-Santibanez, 1957
D. vireni - Bächli, Vilela and Haring, 2002
D. virgulata - Hardy and Kaneshiro, 1968
D. virilis - Sturtevant, 1916
D. vulcana - Graber, 1957
D. vumbae - Bock and Wheeler, 1972

W

D. wachi - Penafiel and Rafael, 2019
D. waddingtoni - Basden, 1976
D. wahihuna - Magnacca and O'Grady, 2009
D. waikamoi - Magnacca and O'Grady, 2009
D. wangi - Toda and Zhang in Zhang, Toda and Watabe, 1995
D. warmi - Penafiel and Rafael, 2019
D. wassermani - Pitnick and Heed, 1994
D. watanabei - Gupta and Gupta, 1992
D. wauana - Okada and Carson, 1982
D. wawae - Magnacca and O'Grady, 2009
D. wayta - Figuero, Leon, Rafael and Cespedes, 2012
D. whartonae - Pipkin and Heed, 1964
D. wheeleri - Patterson and Alexander, 1952
D. wikani - Magnacca and O'Grady, 2009
D. wikstroemiae - Magnacca and O'Grady, 2009
D. williamsi - Hardy, 1965
D. willistoni - Sturtevant, 1916
D. wingei - Cordeiro, 1964

X

D. xalapa - Vilela and Bächli, 2004
D. xanthia - Tsacas, 1981
D. xanthochroa - Tsacas, 2001
D. xanthogaster - Duda, 1924
D. xanthognoma - Hardy, 1965
D. xanthopallescens - Pipkin, 1964
D. xanthosoma - Grimshaw, 1901
D. xenophagaa - Kam and Pereira in O'Grady et al., 2003
D. xerophila - Val in Carson et al., 1983
D. xiphiphora - Pipkin, 1964
D. xuthoptera - Hardy, 1965

Y

D. yakuba - Burla, 1954
D. yambe - Cabezas, Llangari and Rafael, 2015
D. yana - Vela and Rafael, 2005
D. yanaurcus - Figuero, Rafael and Cespedes, 2012
D. yanayuyu - Cespedes and Rafael, 2012
D. yangana - Rafael and Vela, 2003
D. yooni - Hardy, 1977
D. yunnanensis - Watabe and Liang in Watabe et al., 1990
D. yurag - Figuero and Rafael, 2011
D. yuragshina - Figuero and Rafael, 2011
D. yuragyacum - Figuero, Rafael and Cespedes, 2012
D. yuwanensis - Kim and Okada, 1988

Z

D. z-notata - Bryan, 1934
D. zamorana - Penafiel and Rafael, 2018
D. zonata - Chen and Watabe, 1993
D. zophea - Tsacas, 2004
D. zottii - Vilela, 1983

References 

 L
Drosophila
Drosophila